Tollerton is a former village in central Alberta, Canada within Yellowhead County.

History 
Tollerton was established as a division point along the Canadian Northern Railway. Its rail facilities included a train station, a timber water tank, an ice house, a bunk house, a steam-heated engine house, and three rail sidings with capacity to hold 249 cars.

The community incorporated as the Village of Tollerton on December 27, 1913. In 1917, a decision was made to close the Canadian Northern Railway line in favour of the Grand Trunk Pacific Railway through Edson to the north, resulting in the demise of Tollerton. Subsequently, the community dissolved from village status on January 26, 1918.

Demographics 

In the 1916 Census of Prairie Provinces, Tollerton had a population of 49, although Alberta Municipal Affairs indicated that it had a population of 180 in the same year.

See also 
List of communities in Alberta
List of former urban municipalities in Alberta
List of ghost towns in Alberta

References

External links 
Canadian Northern Tollerton Townsite – Atlas of Alberta Railways
Sale of lots for Tollerton townsite, Tollerton, Alberta – Glenbow Museum
View of Tollerton, Alberta – Glenbow Museum

Yellowhead County
Former villages in Alberta
Ghost towns in Alberta